Imperatorin is a furocoumarin and a phytochemical that has been isolated from Urena lobata L. (Malvaceae), Angelica archangelica, Angelica dahurica, Glehnia littoralis, Saposhnikovia divaricata, Cnidium monnieri, Incarvillea younghusbandii, and Zanthoxylum americanum mill. It is biosynthesized from umbelliferone, a coumarin derivative.

Isolation 
The procedure for the isolation of imperatorin from Urena lobata involves exhaustively extracting under reflux with benzene the air-dried and pulverised roots followed by separation by column chromatography.

Biochemical activity 
Imperatorin was identified from a Bioactive Molecules library in a high throughput screening experiment for inhibitors of the phosphodiesterase PDE4. It displays a significant preference for PDE4B over PDE4A.

See also 
Psoralen, the parent furocoumarin.

References 

 

Furanocoumarins
Terpeno-phenolic compounds
Phenol ethers